Lubrza may refer to the following places in Poland:

Rural administrative districts
Gmina Lubrza, Lubusz Voivodeship
Gmina Lubrza, Opole Voivodeship

Villages
 Lubrza, Lubusz Voivodeship
 Lubrza, Opole Voivodeship